Amir Kazim Mirza Qajar (Azerbaijani: Əmir Kazım mirzə Qovanlı-Qacar, born April 19, 1853, Shusha, Shusha Uyezd, Shamakhi Governorate, Imperial Russia - died 30 June 1920, Ganja, Azerbaijan SSR) was a prince in Persia's Qajar dynasty, and a decorated Imperial Russian and Azerbaijani military commander, having the rank of major-general.

He was also involved in charity.

Early life 

He was born in 1853 in Shusha, Shusha Uyezd, Shamakhi Governorate, Russian Imperia. He received general education in the Tbilisi Gymnasium. In 1873 he graduated with honors from the Nikolaev Cavalry School.

Family 
He was a member of the Qajar dynasty. He was born into the family of Bahman Mirza Qajar and Mirvari Khanum Talishiskaya from the Qajar dynasty and received his first education from the family.

Military service 
Amir Kazim who began his military service in 1871, served in the 44th Nizhny Novgorod Regiment (1871-1904; 1906), 1st Amur Cossack Regiment (1904-1906) of the 6th Reserve Cavalry Regiment and Caucasus Military District.

During his service, he completed two military courses with honors: the Caucasian Training Company (1880) and the Officer's Cavalry School (1887-1888) [6]. 

In 1877–78 he took part in the Russo-Turkish War (1877–1878) as a part of the 16th Nizhny Novgorod Dragoon regiment. In one of the battles he was wounded with a bayonet in his left arm. For the distinction in this campaign, Amir Kazim Mirza was awarded several military orders.

On 25 January 1885, Rittmeister Amir Kazim Mirza Qajar was appointed commander of the 2nd squadron. On 26 February  1895, he was promoted to lieutenant colonel. Amir Kazim was promoted to the rank of colonel during the Russo-Japanese War for excellence in service. 

On 2 March 1906, Colonel Mirza Kazim Qajar was appointed to the headquarters of the Caucasian Military District. In 1909, Colonel Mirza Kazim Qajar was promoted to major general, with dismissal from service, on the basis of the rules on the maximum age qualification, with the award of a uniform and a pension.

In December 1918, he had offered Azerbaijan Democratic Republic and joined its army. 
He served in the Azerbaijan Democratic Republic as the commandant of Ganja.

Death  
After the Red Army invasion of Azerbaijan and the suppression of the anti-Soviet uprising in Ganja, Mirza Kazim Qajar was arrested, and executed by the Bolsheviks in the Ganja.

After his death, Mammad Amin Rasulzadeh also remembered Amir Kazim Mirza Qajar in his book Azerbaijan Republic and called him a "martyr of independence".

Awards 
  - 4th Class Order of Saint Anne (1877)
  - 3rd Class Order of Saint Stanislaus  (1878)
  - 3rd Class Order of Saint Anne (1879)
  - 2nd Class Order of Saint Stanislaus (1879)
  - 2nd Class Order of Saint Anne (1881)
  - 4th Class Order of Saint Vladimir with Swords and Banners (1888)
  - Order of the Lion and the Sun
  - Order of Noble Bukhara (1895)
  - Golden Weapon for Bravery (1906)

See also 
 Firudin bey Vazirov
 Abdulhamid bey Gaytabashi

References

Footnotes

Works cited 
 
 

1853 births
1920 deaths
Imperial Russian Army generals
Generals of the Azerbaijan Democratic Republic
Azerbaijani nobility
Qajar princes
Bahmani family
Russian people of Iranian descent
Azerbaijani people of Iranian descent
Participants of the Ganja revolt
Military personnel from Shusha